Volunteer Jam/ Classic Live Performances: Volume one  is a compilation album of live performances from previous Volunteer Jam concerts and albums by American musician Charlie Daniels.

Track listing
Can't You See (performed by Toy Caldwell, Paul T. Riddle, Papa John Creach, Grinderswitch, Bonnie Bramlett, Wet Willie, Chuck Leavell, and CDB) 5:30
Statesboro Blues (performed by Charlie Daniels, Jimmy Hall, and Sea Level) 6:28
Funny How Time Slips Away/Crazy/Night Life (performed by Toy Caldwell and Willie Nelson) 8:25
Mississippi Queen (performed by Molly Hatchet and Ted Nugent) 3:08
Lady Luck (performed by Grinderswitch) 5:08
Down Home Blues (performed by CDB, Papa John Creach, and LA Reflection Section) 5:30
Keep on Smiling (performed by Richie Cannata and Wet Willie) 6:48
The South's Gonna Do It (Again) (performed by Charlie Daniels and Jimmy Hall) 5:11

External links 
 http://www.charliedaniels.com
 http://tennesseeconcerts.com/voljam.html
 http://www.allmusic.com/album/volunteer-jam-classic-live-performances-vol-1-r413062

Charlie Daniels albums
1999 live albums